Victor Charles Harrison (13 January 1911 – 24 September 1987) was an Australian rules footballer who played with Geelong in the Victorian Football League (VFL).

Notes

External links 

1911 births
1987 deaths
Australian rules footballers from Melbourne
Geelong Football Club players
People from South Yarra, Victoria